The Derby delle Isole ("Derby of the Islands") is an Italian Serie A and Serie B derby between the two football clubs Palermo F.C. and Cagliari Calcio. It is played twice a year, unless the two sides do not play in the same division that season.

Derby delle Isole translates in English to the Derby of the Islands, those islands being Sardinia and Sicily.

Statistics

Full list of results
Fixtures from 1968 to 2019 featuring League games and Coppa Italia.

Note: *Cagliari won 4–2 on penalty shoot-out.

All time goal scorers

References 

Isole
Cagliari Calcio
Palermo F.C.